Littlejohni may refer to:

Littlejohn's Tree Frog, Litoria littlejohni
Littlejohn's Toadlet, Uperoleia littlejohni

See also 
Little Johnny